Mount Codrington is a prominent mountain,  high, standing  south-southeast of Cape Close,  east of Johnston Peak, and  south of Simmers Peaks. Mount Codrington forms the northeastern end of the Napier Mountains.

It was charted in 1930 by the British Australian New Zealand Antarctic Research Expedition under Mawson as being the prominent peak sighted and so named by John Biscoe in March 1831.

See also 
 History of Antarctica
 List of Antarctic expeditions

References

External links 
 Australian Antarctic Division
 Australian Antarctic Gazetteer
 Australian Antarctic Names and Medals Committee (AANMC)
 Scientific Committee on Antarctic Research (SCAR)
 PDF Map of the Australian Antarctic Territory
 ANARE Club
 List of Peaks in Enderby Land

Mountains of Enderby Land